Gordon Mee (13 May 1913 – 9 January 1975) was an English professional footballer who played as a goalkeeper in the Football League for Brighton & Hove Albion.

Mee was born in 1913 in Belper, Derbyshire. He played football for the Pottery Wesleyans club in the town before joining Matlock Town. After a trial, he turned professional with Brighton & Hove Albion of the Football League Third Division South in January 1935. He never became first choice, but was a reliable backup for the rest of the decade. He was a police reservist during the war, and spent the first post-war season with Watford, appearing in the 1945–46 FA Cup. He died in Hove, Sussex, in 1975 at the age of 61.

Career statistics

References

1913 births
1975 deaths
People from Belper
Footballers from Derbyshire
English footballers
Association football goalkeepers
Matlock Town F.C. players
Watford F.C. players
Brighton & Hove Albion F.C. players
English Football League players